Reflective listening is a communication strategy involving two key steps: seeking to understand a speaker's idea, then offering the idea back to the speaker, to confirm the idea has been understood correctly. Reflective listening is a more specific strategy than the more general methods of active listening.

Form of Empathy 
Reflective listening arose from Carl Rogers' school of client-centered therapy in counseling theory. It is not just repeating back word for word what was said, but reflective listening is a practice of expressing with genuine understanding. Empathy is at the center of Rogers' approach. Reflective listening takes practice, and there must be a sincere interest while listening to the speaker in order for them to truly express themselves.

Style of Communication 
Reflective listening is one of the core skills of motivational interviewing, a style of communication that works collaboratively to encourage change. When reflecting on the words of the person speaking, keep their tone and other nonverbal clues in mind to create a reflection.

There will be times in daily life that reflective listening can be helpful. For example, if a loved one is suffering from depression and is not being honest about their feelings, using reflective listening could be an effective strategy to help them open up. Dr. Xavier Amador suggests if your partner claims they are doing fine, then you could respond with, “What you’re telling me is that there’s nothing wrong, is that correct? Can I tell you what I’ve noticed?” These questions can allow the other party to feel valued, as they sometimes just want to be heard and not given advice immediately.

Reflective listening is a crucial component in various occupations that require direct communication with others. Failure to understand the needs of the person speaking can result in errors in work such as problems being unresolved or decisions not being quickly made.

Additional application 
Reflective listening has been found to be effective in a therapeutic setting. Using empathy to actively listen allows for better understanding of the context between both parties. Subjects receiving reflective listening from a counselor have reported better therapeutic relationship and more disclosure of feelings. With a positive relationship between both parties achieved my reflective listening, there is an increase chance of recovery. With a positive relationship between both parties achieved my reflective listening, there is an increase chance of recovery.

Students that are entering the counseling field took part in a qualitative study that utilizes music, specifically song lyrics, to enhance their reflective listening skills. By interpreting the emotions and feelings behind the words of a song, these participants are able to recognize hidden messages which is a skill they can transfer to listening to their future clients.

See also 
 Clean language
 Focusing (psychotherapy)
 Motivational interviewing

References

Further reading 

 Fisher, Dalmar (1981). Communication in organizations. St. Paul, Minnesota: West Publishing Company.

 Katz, Neil H. and John W. Lawyer (1985). Communication and conflict resolution skills. Dubuque, Iowa: Kendall Hunt.
 Kotzman, Anne (1984). Reflective listening. Kew, Victoria: Institute of Early Childhood Development.
 Rogers, Carl (1951). Client-Centered Therapy: its current practice, implications, and theory. Boston: Houghton Mifflin.

External links 
 Reflective Listening — One-page summary used by National Health Care for the Homeless Council (currently under construction as of January 12, 2013)

Counseling
Human communication
Behavior modification